Reinhold Mitterlehner (born 10 December 1955) is an Austrian politician of the Austrian People's Party (ÖVP) who served as minister of economy in Austria's government from 2008 until 2017. In September 2014 he also became vice chancellor of Austria and chairman of the ÖVP. On 9 May 2016 he briefly assumed powers and duties as Acting Chancellor of Austria while his coalition partner, the Social Democratic Party, underwent a change in leadership. After a series of quarrels within the grand coalition as well as his own party, Mitterlehner announced his resignation on 10 May 2017, which became effective on 17 May 2017.

Early life and education
Mitterlehner was born in Helfenberg, Upper Austria, on 10 December 1955. He holds a doctorate in law, which he received from the Johannes Kepler University Linz in 1980. He then attended a post-graduate course in association management in Fribourg.

Career
From 1980 to 1992 Mitterlehner worked at the Upper Austrian economic chamber, where he assumed various posts, including the head of the marketing department. From 1992 to 2000 he served as the secretary general of the Austrian Economic League (ÖWB) in Vienna. In addition, he was a local politician in Ahorn from 1991 to 1997. He was appointed party chairman for Rohrbach District in May 2002.

Member of the Austrian Parliament, 2000–2008
A member of the Austrian People's Party (ÖVP), Mitterlehner was elected to the Austrian Parliament on 8 February 2000, where he served on the Committee on Labour and Social Affairs (2000–2008); the Committee on Economic Affairs (2000–2008); and the finance committee (2003–2008), among others.

Meanwhile, also in 2000, Mitterlehner was named deputy secretary general of the Austrian federal economic chamber (WKO), holding that post until 2008.

Federal Minister of Economic Affairs, 2008–2017
Following the 2008 national elections, on 2 December 2008, Mitterlehner was appointed as Federal Minister of Economy, Family and Youth as part of the coalition government led by Chancellor Werner Faymann. In 2008, he was also named vice president of the Austrian Energy Agency.

Mitterlehner was one of the leading candidates to succeed Josef Pröll, who left the leadership of the party in April 2011. Instead, from 2011 to 2014 he was deputy federal chairman of the People's Party and only became the successor of Michael Spindelegger as party chairman in September 2014 from whom he also took the position of Vice Chancellor of Austria. At the time, Mitterlehner said he would prefer not to serve as finance minister as well, a dual role that Spindelegger had performed.

After the ÖVP lost votes in provincial elections to the right-wing, anti-immigration Freedom Party (FPÖ) in 2015, Mitterlehner publicly threatened to quit the coalition government if Faymann's Social Democrat partners did not toughen their policies on migrants and shrink the welfare state.

Other activities

Corporate boards
 Oberösterreichische Versicherung (OÖ), Chairman of the Supervisory Board (since 2019)
 Global Hydro Energy, Member of the Advisory Board

Non-profit organizations
 Österreichische Forschungsgemeinschaft (ÖFG), President (since 2018)
 National Fund of the Republic of Austria for Victims of National Socialism, ex officio member of the board of trustees
 Industriewissenschaftliches Institut (IWI), member of the board of trustees
 International Association for the Exchange of Students for Technical Experience (IAESTE), member of the board of trustees

Personal life
Mitterlehner is married and has three daughters.

References

External links

1955 births
21st-century Chancellors of Austria
Austrian People's Party politicians
Chancellors of Austria
Government ministers of Austria
Johannes Kepler University Linz alumni
Living people
Members of the Austrian Parliament
People from Rohrbach District
Vice-Chancellors of Austria
21st-century Austrian politicians